Actinosoma is a genus of orb-weaver spiders containing the single species, Actinosoma pentacanthum. It was  first described by E. L. Holmberg in 1883, and is found throughout South America, from Colombia to Argentina.

References

Araneidae
Monotypic Araneomorphae genera
Spiders of South America